The election to the 17th Uttar Pradesh Legislative Assembly was held from 11 February to 8 March 2017 in 7 phases. This election saw a voter turnout of 61.11% compared to 59.40% in the previous election. The Bharatiya Janata Party (BJP) won the election by an overwhelming three-quarters majority of 325 seats despite not projecting a chief ministerial candidate before the election. As part of its election strategy, BJP contested under a collective leadership and capitalised mostly on the political clout and 'brand' of its leader Narendra Modi.

On 18 March 2017, Yogi Adityanath was appointed as the Chief Minister of Uttar Pradesh. Then Uttar Pradesh BJP chief Keshav Prasad Maurya and Dinesh Sharma were appointed as Deputy Chief Ministers.

Background

Electoral process changes
In January 2016, the Election Commission of India published updated electoral rolls in all 403 assembly segments. In July 2016, Election Commission decided to increase the number of polling booths in Uttar Pradesh for the 2017 Assembly elections. New polling centres will be planned in the constituencies having more than 1,500 registered voters as well as polling booths in six constituencies of Muzaffarnagar, Budhana, Purkazi, Khatoli, Charthawal and Midanpur to be raised from 1,769 to 1,819 booths. Voter assistance booths would be set up and photo slip of voters in a new design would be sent to them. First time, the Form-2B would contain the photograph of the candidates and their nationality.

Voter-verified paper audit trail (VVPAT) machines was used along with EVM in 30 assembly constituencies covering 14 districts including Varanasi, Ghaziabad and Bareilly constituency.

As per the special summary revision of electoral rolls, there are a total of 14.05 crore voters in Uttar Pradesh as of January 2015.

Schedule 

Assembly elections in Uttar Pradesh were held between 11 February and 8 March 2017. The term of the outgoing government ended on 27 May 2017.

On 4 January 2017, The Election Commission of India announced the election schedule to the Legislative Assembly of Uttar Pradesh along with the other four state (Goa, Manipur, Punjab and Uttarakhand) which are due for an election. The entire election is scheduled into 7 phases.

Predictions

Opinion polls
Various organisations/agencies have been conducting opinions polls to predict voter intentions in the upcoming legislative assembly elections.

Exit polls 
Various organisations/agencies have been conducting Exit polls to predict voter intentions in the legislative assembly elections. Hindi newspaper Dainik Jagran had published an exit poll promoting BJP, after first phase of the election. This led to its editor being arrested for violating the ban on exit polls during the election.

Result
The election results for all 403 Legislative Assembly seats were declared on 11 March 2017.

Region-wise

Results by constituency

Reactions
After the BJP emerged as the majority party in the election, Prime Minister Narendra Modi thanked the public in a tweet saying, "Gratitude to the people of India for the continued faith, support and affection for the BJP. This is very humbling & overwhelming." The BJP's UP chief Keshav Prasad Maurya attributed the victory to Modi saying, "It is a Modi wave. The wave which started with 2014 Lok Sabha elections is continuing in 2017 and the momentum will go beyond the 2019 general elections." Congress vice-president Rahul Gandhi sent a tweet to Modi congratulating him for his party's victory, to which Modi replied, "Thank you. Long live democracy!" Modi was congratulated on the victory by U.S. President Donald Trump during a telephone conversation on 27 March 2017.

The BBC wrote that the BJP "appears to have successfully forged a coalition of upper, middle-ranking and lower castes to be able to manipulate the social arithmetic of Indian elections". It also noted that the party successfully avoided the image of "doling out reckless patronage to a caste or group", which the BBC considered responsible for the SP's defeat. Bhanu Joshi of Delhi-based think tank Centre for Policy Research said, "He [Modi] has managed to go beyond the caste arithmetic. On the ground, the BJP is not perceived as a casteist party."

Political scientist Milan Vaishnav felt that the election "represents a referendum on demonetisation". Vaishnav said, "Whether voters were bothered by the implementation of the policy or not, they clearly have decided that the PM is a man of action."

BSP Leader and former Chief Minister Mayavati claimed that the BJP tampered with the Electronic Voting Machines (EVM) thereby rigging the election outcome. However, this charge was rejected by the Election Commission as well as other parties as lacking any substance.

See also
 2012 elections in India
 2017 elections in India
 Elections in Uttar Pradesh
 List of constituencies of the Uttar Pradesh Legislative Assembly

References

External links
 Chief Electoral Officer Uttar Pradesh

February 2017 events in India
March 2017 events in India
2017 State Assembly elections in India
State Assembly elections in Uttar Pradesh